Hostage is a 2001 thriller novel by Robert Crais, set in fictional Bristo Bay, California, about a small town police chief named Jeff Talley with memories of a failed hostage situation, who must negotiate the same type of situation in his own town if he wants his own family to live.

Plot
Three young boys rob a minimart and the salesclerk is killed. Police chase the boys and they end up taking a family hostage. The house taken hostage was owned by Sonny Benza, a man who rules over the West Coast's most powerful Mafia empire. Sonny arranges for his men to kidnap the small town's police chief, Jeff Talley's, family. Talley goes to the location where his family is being held. A man named Marion Clewes executes Benza and his associates for their failure because Marion's employer in New York feels that Benza had betrayed the trust of Marion's employer by failing to retrieve two discs that would shut down Benza's organization and put Benza away for good. The police obtain one of the discs. Rather than killing Talley and his family, Marion lets them live.

Adaptations
The novel was adapted to the 2005 thriller film Hostage with Bruce Willis and director Florent Emilio Siri by screenwriter Doug Richardson.

References

2001 American novels
American thriller novels
Novels set in California
American novels adapted into films